The Chrysler Hemi-6 engine is a family of inline six-cylinder petrol engines produced by Chrysler Australia in three piston displacements and multiple configurations. Hemi-6 engines were installed in Australian-market Chrysler Valiants from 1970 through 1981. It was also installed in the Valiants closely related variants, the Chrysler VIP, the Chrysler by Chrysler & the Valiant Charger.

Development and release
Chrysler Corporation in the US had been working since 1966 on an inline 6-cylinder engine, called the D-engine, to replace the Slant 6 (G-engine) in Dodge trucks, but abandoned the effort after prototypes were built. This was Chrysler's first thin wall (lightweight) cast iron engine design. Chrysler Australia wanted a new six-cylinder engine for use in the Australian Chrysler Valiant, and so Chrysler USA sent a prototype engine to Chrysler Australia's engineers to continue developing the D-engine. The first  variant was released for the 1970 model year in the VG-model Valiant.

In a major coup for the company, Chrysler Australia's ad agency, the Young & Rubicam Advertising Agency in Adelaide, South Australia, secured the services of British racing driver Stirling Moss to promote the new Hemi-6  in 1969. The agency managed to fly Moss to Adelaide in secret for the advertising campaign, surprising Chrysler Australia's executives. Young & Rubicam's parent company were also the advertising agents for the Chrysler Corporation in the US.

Engineering and design features
The Hemi-6 is a pushrod O.H.V. (overhead valve engine), with combustion chambers comprising about 35% of the top of the globe. This creates what is known as a low hemispherical shaped chamber. In this way, the "Hemi" moniker was used for the same kind of marketing cachet as Chrysler's 1950s-1970s Hemi V8 engines.

The 6 intake and 6 exhaust valves open slightly towards each other and away from the cylinder wall, which results in less "shrouding" of the valves and greater airflow potential. In addition, both valves are slightly inclined across the crankshaft axis, similar to a conventional "wedge" chamber. The cylinder head is not a crossflow design, meaning the 6 intake and 6 exhaust ports are on the same side of the engine (the left, Australian and British passenger, side).

Unlike Chrysler's contemporaneous hemi V8 engines, the Hemi-6's rocker arms are mounted on individual studs (similar to the Chevrolet "big block" V8), rather than on 2 separate rocker shafts as in all 1951-58 Hemis—Dodge, DeSoto, Imperial, and Chrysler "Firepower" and 1964-'71 Plymouth and Dodge 426 V8s.

All Hemi-6s share a robust crankshaft supported by seven main bearings, and this family of engines quickly developed a reputation for excellent performance, economy, and durability.

The Australian Hemi engines were designed by a five-man team which included the late Maurice Harcus.

Versions and variants

245 cu in (4.0 L)

The 245 was the initial version of the Hemi-6 engine. It was first used in the 1970 VG-model Valiant, and was available clear through to the final CM model of 1981. Initially, only a single barrel carburettor version was available for Australian built cars but a two barrel version was made especially for the VH and VJ Valiant Ranger XL variants assembled in New Zealand from 1971 to 1975. The two barrel consequently became available in Australia with the VK series update.

Specifications (for 1bbl carbureted variant):
Bore x Stroke Size: 
Compression ratio: 9.5:1
Power:  at 4600 rpm
Torque:  at 1800 rpm
Intake valve head diameter: 
Exhaust: 

245LC (Low Compression) released in 1977
Bore x Stroke Size: 
Compression ratio: 7.6:1
Power:  estimate
Torque:  estimate
Intake valve head diameter 
Exhaust valve head diameter

265 cu in (4.3 L)

The  was introduced in 1971 in the VH. It used a new cylinder block with a bigger bore diameter of —the same as many of the Chrysler small-block V8s—and a new cylinder head, having slightly more hemispherical shaped combustion chambers with larger valves.

The increased power is due mainly to a more aggressive camshaft, high-load valve springs, triple  DCOE sidedraught Weber carburetors, tuned-length exhaust headers and a higher compression ratio of 10.0:1.

Specifications (for 2bbl carbureted variant):
Bore x Stroke Size: 
Compression ratio: 9.5:1
Power:  at 4600 rpm
Torque:  at 2800 rpm
Intake valve head diameter: 
Exhaust:

215 cu in (3.5 L)
This economy-orientated version of the Hemi 6 was released as a running change in early 1971 as the base model engine in the VH Valiant.

Specifications:
Bore x Stroke Size: 
Compression ratio: 8.0:1
Power:  at 4400 rpm
Torque:  at 1800 rpm
Intake valve head diameter: 
Exhaust valve head diameter:

References

Chrysler engines
Straight-six engines
Gasoline engines by model